Melbourne Recital Centre is a venue for live music in Melbourne and welcomes over 200,000 visitors each year. The organisation programs and presents more than 500 concerts and events a year across diverse range of musical genres including classical and chamber, contemporary, pop, folk, rock, electronica, indie, jazz, cabaret and world music. It was opened in 2009, as part of the Melbourne Recital Centre and Melbourne Theatre Company Southbank Theatre complex designed by Ashton Raggat McDougall, and is located on the corner of Southbank Boulevard and Sturt Street in the Melbourne Arts Precinct, Southbank. It is Melbourne's second largest auditorium for classical music (after Hamer Hall in Arts Centre Melbourne).

Facilities
The centre features two auditoria, the Elisabeth Murdoch Hall, and a smaller Salon. The former, a "modified shoe box" shaped music venue, is named after Dame Elisabeth Murdoch. It has seating for 1000 on two levels and was designed by Ashton Raggatt McDougall with acoustic and theatre consulting by Arup.

The  stage, with optional  extension is designed to accommodate up to 45–65 musicians, making it well suited to chamber music and other small ensemble music. To eliminate noise from the nearby Southbank Boulevard cars and trams, it is surrounded by 250mm of concrete, mounted on 38 steel springs. The interior is lined with Hoop Pine plywood and is designed to give ideal bass response for cello and low brass. The shoebox shape, size and wooden surfaces were designed to provide a reverberation time of 1.6 to 1.8 seconds 

The Salon can seat 136 people. The lighting, seating and stage can be configured to suit the performance.

Building awards
Melbourne Recital Centre and MTC Theatre complex won the Moore Stephens National Award for Public Buildings at the Property Council of Australia – the country's highest award for a public building. The complex also won the Victorian Architecture Medal, the William Wardell Award for Public Architecture and the Joseph Reed Award for Urban Design at the Australian Institute of Architects State Architecture Awards in 2009.

Awards and nominations

Music Victoria Awards
The Music Victoria Awards are an annual awards night celebrating Victorian music. They commenced in 2006. The award for Best Venue was introduced in 2016.

! 
|-
| Music Victoria Awards of 2016
| Melbourne Recital Centre
| Best Venue (Over 500 Capacity)
| 
|rowspan="5"| 
|-
| Music Victoria Awards of 2017
| Melbourne Recital Centre
| Best Venue (Over 500 Capacity)
| 
|-
| Music Victoria Awards of 2018
| Melbourne Recital Centre
| Best Venue (Over 500 Capacity)
| 
|-
| Music Victoria Awards of 2019
| Melbourne Recital Centre
| Best Venue (Over 500 Capacity)
| 
|-
| Music Victoria Awards of 2020
| Melbourne Recital Centre
| Best Venue (Over 500 Capacity)
| 
|-
| 2021 Music Victoria Awards
| Melbourne Recital Centre
| Best Venue (Over 500 Capacity)
| 
| 
|-
| 2022 Music Victoria Awards
| Melbourne Recital Centre
| Best Large Venue (Metro)
| 
| 
|-

See also
The Arts Centre (Melbourne)
Architectural acoustics

References

External links
Melbourne Recital Centre website

Concert halls in Australia
Music venues completed in 2009
Music venues in Melbourne
Buildings and structures in the City of Melbourne (LGA)
Southbank, Victoria